Samuel Fowler may refer to:

Samuel Fowler (1779–1844), New Jersey Congressman from 1833 to 1837
Samuel Fowler (1851–1919), New Jersey Congressman from 1889 to 1893
J. Samuel Fowler (1874–1961), New York politician
Sam and Amanda Fowler, fictional characters in U.S. soap opera Another World